Kalidas Madhu Sadhwani (1465–1537) was a Bijapuri general who helped Yusuf Adil Shah establish his power as a Sultan, independent from Bahmani Sultanate.  He was a Bahmani nobleman from a family with military traditions.  His father was a commander in the army of Ahmadnagar sultan.  Young Kalidas was sent to military school in Persia (Ak Koyunlu) where he was educated under the eye of Ak Koyunlu's Shahinshah - Murad I.  He spent there about six years of his life, and then returned to Bahmani, where he met Yusuf Adil Shah at the court of the Bahmani Sultan.  Yusuf Adil Shah was then a powerful nobleman, whose career was rising very quickly.  Kalidas knew that Yusuf's future would be very promising, so he decided to create a friendship between them. Then Adil became a mentor of Sadhwani.  Young adventurer and a promising military leader admired Yusuf's strong character, intelligence, bravery and silver-tongue also, nevertheless Kalidas Madhu Sadhwani was right - Yusuf Adil Shah soon became a sultan of Bijapur and had not forgot about his old friend. Bijapur Sultan made Sadhwani main commander of all his troops in appreciation of his support. Kalidas also formed a private army which he was using also to help his mentor in establishing power.

Soon, in 1489 Yusuf Adil Shah decided to take advantage to create Bijapur not as a Bahmani province but as an independent sultanate. Mahmud II, the Bahmani Sultan could not allow such act of ignorance and soon, he sent some troops to defeat Adil. Yusuf and Kalidas suspected that and both led a counter-army. In the battle of Gadag, outnumbered troops of Adil Shah defeated bigger Bahmani's army - decisive victory of Bijapuri's troops was a great service of Kalidas Sadhwani where he have shown his prominent and outstanding military talent. During the battle he spontaneously gathered his light cavalry and led a brave but risky charge, which turned out to be a great success and made Bahmani Sultan retreat and proved the skills of Kalidas. As a leader, since 1489 he was constantly commanding the same army to adapt Adil's authority and power until ~1500 where after about 10 years of larger and smaller fights situation became stable and Yusuf's power were confirmed. During this time, Kalidas Madhu Sadhwani was a leader of all Bijapuri's troops engaged to fight the political enemies or people who wanted to take over the throne. Soon, diplomatic relations with neighbouring sultans became confirmed, stable and started to be more friendly. History of ancient India is full of wars and never ending battles for power, which every single sultan had to deal with. Those who were weak, were soon consumed by stronger enemy and those who managed to defeat themselves from neighbours still had to handle constant incursions but almost always such incursions were quickly pacified.

Further history of Kalidas Adhu Sadhwani was other military victories, brilliant career and increasing prestige. Sadhwani is underestimated by modern historians and his deeds are underrated. Sadhwani was not a man of a political sense and didn't enjoy court life such as intrigues which were very common all over the world, he was considered as a not much of a thinker.  He had attached his life with a Bijapuri's sultans and stuck to this, until his death.  Modern historians say that if he would want to, his career could be far more brilliant than it was and his loyalty to Adil's actually brought much more profits to Adil's than Sadhwani, who used his military talents only in Shah's orders. Yusuf Adil Shah had his support until his death in 1511 and then, his advancement succeeded to Ismail Adil Shah who died in 1534 and then, Kalidas Sadhwani died soon after Ismail - in 1537. He actually became forgotten by future sultans as well as Deccani people and historians, who never attached to him bigger attention.

1465 births
1537 deaths
Adil Shahi dynasty